By-elections to the 12th Canadian Parliament were held to elect members of the House of Commons of Canada between the 1911 federal election and the 1917 federal election. The Conservative Party of Canada led a majority government for the 12th Canadian Parliament.

The list includes Ministerial by-elections which occurred due to the requirement that Members of Parliament recontest their seats upon being appointed to Cabinet. These by-elections were almost always uncontested. This requirement was abolished in 1931.

See also
List of federal by-elections in Canada

Sources
 Parliament of Canada–Elected in By-Elections 

1917 elections in Canada
1916 elections in Canada
1915 elections in Canada
1914 elections in Canada
1913 elections in Canada
1912 elections in Canada
1911 elections in Canada
12th